Katrina Jane Mitchell  (born 23 September 1964) is an English theatre director.

Life and career
Mitchell was born in Reading, Berkshire, raised in Hermitage, Berkshire, and educated at Oakham School. Upon leaving Oakham, she went up to Magdalen College, Oxford, to read English.

She began her career behind the scenes at the King's Head Theatre in London before taking on work as an assistant director at theatre companies including Paines Plough (1987) and the Royal Shakespeare Company (RSC) (1988 - 1989). Early in her career in the 1990s, she directed five early productions under the umbrella of her company Classics On A Shoestring,  including Women of Troy for which she won a Time Out Award.

In 1989, she was awarded a Winston Churchill Travel Fellowship  to study director’s training in Russian, Georgia, Lithuania and Poland and the work she saw there, including productions by Lev Dodin, Eimuntas Nekrosius and Anatoly Vasiliev, influenced her own practice for the next twenty years.

In 1996, Mitchell started directing operas at Welsh National Opera where she directed four productions, including Handel's Jephtha and Jancek's Jenůfa. Since then, she has directed operas at houses, including the Royal Opera House, English National Opera, Glyndebourne, the Salzburg Festival, Berlin State Opera, the Royal Danish Opera, Opéra-Comique (Paris), Geneva Opera and the Aix-en-Provence Festival.

Mitchell was an Associate Director at the Royal Shakespeare Company between 1996 and 1998. In 1997, Mitchell became responsible for programming at The Other Place, the RSC's former black box theatre. While at the RSC she directed nine productions, including  The Phoenician Women which won her the Evening Standard Award for Best Director in 1996. Between 2000 and 2003 she was an Associate Director at the Royal Court Theatre and between 2003 and 2011 she was an Associate of the Royal National Theatre.

She has directed thirteen productions for the Royal Court, including Ten Billion (2012) and 2071(2014) about the climate emergency, an issue she is passionate about. Recent productions at the Royal Court include her ongoing collaboration with the writer Alice Birch on Ophelia’s Zimmer (Ophelia's Room) and Anatomy of a Suicide.

At the National Theatre, she has directed eighteen productions, the most innovative being an adaptation of Virginia Woolf’s novel, The Waves, where she combined theatre making with the use of live video, creating a form later called ‘live cinema’.

The live cinema work was subsequently developed in Germany and France. She has directed more than 15 live cinema productions in the UK, Austria, Germany and France, at theatres like the Schaubühne Theatre (Berlin) and the Schauspielhaus in Cologne, and these pieces have toured the world including Greece, Russia, China, Portugal and Brazil.

Whilst at the National Theatre, Mitchell pioneered children’s theatre for primary school age theatre goers, including an adaptation of Dr. Seuss’s Cat in the Hat. Her interest in this age group also led her to initiate English National Opera’s first ever opera commission for a primary school audience - an adaptation of Oliver Jeffers' book, The Way Back Home.

From 2008, Mitchell started working regularly on mainland Europe in Germany, Holland, France, Denmark and Austria.  Her first production for the Cologne Schauspielhaus, Wunschkonzert, earned her a place at the Theatertreffen in Berlin and since then she has directed four productions for the Cologne Schauspielhaus, seven for the Schaubühne Theatre, Berlin, and six for the Hamburg Schauspielhaus. She has also worked at the Toneelgroep, Amsterdam, and twice at the Bouffes du Nord, Paris. She is a resident director at the Schaubühne Theatre, Berlin, the Hamburg Schauspielhaus and had a seven-year artist-in-residency at the Aix-en-Provence Festival. In 2015 the Stadsschouwburg theatre in Amsterdam held a retrospective of her opera and theatre work, presenting eight productions from across Europe.

In 2009, Mitchell published The Director’s Craft: A Handbook for the Theatre (Routledge), her practical manual to help emerging directors learn how to direct. She also published two books based on her live cinema productions – …some trace of her and Waves, both in 2008.

Mitchell has also directed installations, including Five Truths at the Victoria and Albert Museum. In 2011 The Department of Theatre and Performance at the V&A invited Mitchell and Leo Warner of 59 Productions to conceive and produce a video installation exploring the nature of 'truth in performance'. Taking as its inspiration 5 of the most influential European theatre directors of the last century, the project examines how each of the practitioners would direct the actress playing Ophelia in the 'mad' scenes in Shakespeare's Hamlet. This multiscreen video installation, launched at the Chantiers Europe festival at the Théâtre de la Ville in Paris on 4 June, and opened at the V&A on 12 July 2011.

In a career spanning thirty years, Mitchell has directed over 100 shows - over 70 theatre productions and nearly 30 operas. She is currently a Professor of Theatre Directing at Royal Holloway, University of London, where she teaches on an MA in directing. Other academic positions include:
 Cultural Fellow at King’s College, London 2015 –Present
 Honorary Fellow at Rose Bruford College, London 2014
 Visiting Fellow at Central St Martins, London 2016 – 2018
 Visiting Professor of Opera at Oxford University 2017

Reputation
Mitchell has been described as "a director who polarises audiences like no other" and "the closest thing the British theatre has to an auteur". In 2007, the artistic director of the NT accused the British press of affording Mitchell's productions "misogynistic reviews, where everything they say is predicated on her sex".

Her productions have been described as "distinguished by the intensity of the emotions, the realism of the acting, and the creation of a very distinctive world" and accused of "a willful disregard for classic texts", but Mitchell suggests that while "there's a signature in every director's work", it is not her intent to work to a "strong personal signature".

At the beginning of her career, Mitchell's process involved long and intensive rehearsal periods and use of Stanislavski's system. She regularly involves psychiatry in looking at characters, and in 2004 directed a series of workshops on Stanislavski and neuroscience at the NT studio. Since her 2006 play Waves, she has also experimented with video projections in a number of productions.

In 2016 Mitchell was described as ‘British theatre’s Queen in exile’ and a director who ‘provokes strong reactions.’  Some see her ‘as a vandal, ripping apart classic texts and distorting them to her own dubious purpose’ and others ‘consider her to be the most important British director of theatre and opera at work today – indeed, among the greatest in the world.’ (The Guardian, 14 January 2016)

Personal life
She has a daughter Edie, born 2005.

Honours
Mitchell was appointed Officer of the Order of the British Empire (OBE) in the 2009 New Year Honours.

In 2011, she was awarded the Europe Prize Theatrical Realities, in Saint Petersburg.

In September 2017, she was awarded the President's Medal of the British Academy "for her work to enhance the presentation of classic and contemporary theatre and opera through innovative new production".

Selected directing credits

1994: Rutherford and Son by Githa Sowerby
1995: The Machine Wreckers (Die Maschinenstürmer) by Ernst Toller
1996: The Phoenician Women by Euripides
1996: Don Giovanni, an opera by Wolfgang Amadeus Mozart
1998: Jenůfa, an opera by Leoš Janáček
1998: Uncle Vanya, a version by David Lan of Anton Chekhov's play 
2000: The Oresteia, a version by Ted Hughes from Aeschylus
2000: The Country, by Martin Crimp
2001: Káťa Kabanová, an opera by Leoš Janáček
2002: Ivanov by Anton Chekhov
2003: Jephtha, an oratorio by George Frideric Handel
2003: Three Sisters by Anton Chekhov
2004: The Turn of the Screw (film), opera by Benjamin Britten
2004: Iphigenia in Aulis by Euripides
2005: A Dream Play by August Strindberg
2006: The Seagull, a version by Martin Crimp of Anton Chekhov's play
2006: Waves, based on Virginia Woolf's novel The Waves
2007: Attempts on Her Life by Martin Crimp
2007: Women of Troy by Euripides
2008: The City by Martin Crimp
2008: ...Some Trace of Her inspired / based on The Idiot by Fyodor Dostoyevsky
2008: The Maids by Jean Genet, Sweden
2009: Wunschkonzert by Franz Xaver Kroetz, Schauspiel Köln, Cologne, Germany
2009: After Dido based on Dido and Aeneas by Purcell (for English National Opera at the Young Vic)
2009: Pains of Youth, a version by Martin Crimp of Ferdinand Bruckner's play  at the National Theatre
2009: Parthenogenesis an opera by James MacMillan and Michael Symmons Roberts at the Royal Opera House
2009: The Cat in the Hat by Dr. Seuss at the National Theatre and at the Young Vic
2010: Idomeneo by Wolfgang Amadeus Mozart at English National Opera
2010: Fräulein Julie after August Strindberg at the Schaubühne, Berlin, Germany
2010: Beauty And The Beast by Lucy Kirkwood at the National Theatre
2011: Clemency, an opera by James MacMillan and Michael Symmons Roberts at the Royal Opera House
2011: Die Wellen based on Virginia Woolf's The Waves at Schauspiel Köln, Cologne, Germany
2011: Wastwater by Simon Stephens at the Royal Court Theatre, London
2011: A Woman Killed With Kindness by Thomas Heywood at the National Theatre, London
2012: The Trial of Ubu Roi by Simon Stephens at the Hampstead Theatre, London
2012: Written on Skin, an opera by George Benjamin, libretto by Martin Crimp at the Grand Théâtre de Provence during the Aix-en-Provence Festival
2012: Die Ringe des Saturn by W. G. Sebald at the Avignon Festival
2012: Ten Billion by Katie Mitchell and Stephen Emmott at the Avignon Festival
2012: Reise Durch Die Nacht by Friederike Mayröcker at Schauspiel Köln, Cologne, Germany
2013: Le vin herbé by Frank Martin at Berlin State Opera, Berlin
2013: The House Taken Over by Vasco Mendonça at the Aix-en-Provence Festival
2013: Alles Weitere Kennen Sie aus dem Kino a version by Martin Crimp of Euripides' The Phoenician Women at the Deutsches Schauspielhaus Hamburg
2013: Die gelbe Tapete by Charlotte Perkins Gilman at the Schaubühne, Berlin, Germany
2013: Atmen by Duncan Macmillan at Schaubühne, Berlin, Germany
2014: Wunschloses Unglück by Peter Handke at Burgtheater, Vienna, Austria
2014: The Forbidden Zone von Duncan Macmillan, Salzburger Festspiele, Austria
2015: Glückliche Tage by Samuel Beckett at Deutsches Schauspielhaus, Hamburg, Germany
2015: Alcina by Handel at Festival d'Aix-en-Provence (Streaming-Live, Blu-ray/DVD released in 2016)
2015: Reisende auf einem Bein by Herta Müller at Deutsches Schauspielhaus, Hamburg, Germany
2016: Cleansed by Sarah Kane at the Royal National Theatre, London
2016: Lucia di Lammermoor by Gaetano Donizetti at Royal Opera House
2016: Neither by Morton Feldman at Berlin State Opera
2016: Schatten (Eurydice sagt) by Elfriede Jelinek at Schaubühne, Berlin, Germany
2016: Pelléas et Mélisande by Claude Debussy at Festival d'Aix-en-Provence (Streaming-Live)
2017: Anatomy of a Suicide by Alice Birch at Royal Court Theatre
2019: Orlando by Virginia Woolf with the Schaubühne, Berlin
2021: little scratch by Rebecca Watson (adapted by Miriam Battye) at Hampstead Theatre

Awards

 She was awarded a Churchill fellowship in 1989
 Time Out Award 1991 for Arden of Faversham and Women of Troy (UK)
 Evening Standard Best Director Award 1996 (UK)
 The Theatertreffen Prize 2008 (Germany)
 The Theatertreffen Prize 2009  (Germany)
 An OBIE Best Production Award in 2009 (USA)
 Europe Theatre Prize - Europe Prize Theatrical Realities, 2011 (Europe)
 Golden Mask Award for Best Foreign Production for Fraulein Julie in 2011 (Russia)
 The Best Production Reumert Prize for The Seagull in 2012 (Denmark)
 The Best Director Nestroy Prize for Reise durch die Nacht in 2013 (Austria)
 The Stanislavsky International Prize 2014 (Russia)
 British Academy President’s Medal in 2017: for her work to enhance the presentation of classic and contemporary theatre and opera through innovative new productions. (UK)
 The Tonic Award in 2018: for her representations of women and nurture of female talent in (UK)
 Golden Mask Award for Best Opera Director for her production of Alcina in 2019 (Russia)
 Best Director 2019 for International Opera Awards (UK)

Notes

External links

"Katie Mitchell" search results at the Royal National Theatre
"Dans The Forbidden Zone Katie Mitchell conjugue brillamment théâtre et cinéma" by Jean-Luc Lebreton, unidivers.fr 
Katie Mitchell Operabase
Les Archives du Spectacle

 

1964 births
Living people
Alumni of Magdalen College, Oxford
English theatre directors
English television directors
Officers of the Order of the British Empire
People educated at Oakham School
British opera directors
Women theatre directors
Recipients of the President's Medal (British Academy)
Female opera directors
British women television directors